The Men's 200 Breaststroke event at the 10th FINA World Aquatics Championships swam July 23–24, 2003 in Barcelona, Spain. Preliminary and Semifinal heats swam on 23 July, while the Final swam on 24 July.

At the start of the event, the existing World (WR) and Championship (CR) records were:
WR: 2:09.52 swum by Dmitri Komornikov (Russia) on June 14, 2003 in Barcelona, Spain
CR: 2:10.69 swum by Brendan Hansen (USA) on July 26, 2001 in Fukuoka, Japan

Results

Final

Semifinals

Preliminaries

References

Swimming at the 2003 World Aquatics Championships